Frasch may refer to:

 Frasch, the North Frisian language
 Herman Frasch (18511914), German mining engineer and inventor
 Frasch process, a method of extracting sulfur from underground deposits, devised by Herman Frasch
 Tilman Frasch (active from 1994), German historian

See also 
 

Surnames of German origin